The Musan Kwangsan Line, or Musan Mining Line is a non-electrified freight-only railway line of the Korean State Railway in Musan County, North Hamgyŏng Province, North Korea, running from Ch'ŏlsong on the Musan Line to Musan Kwangsan.

History
The Musan Mining Line was opened by the Korean State Railway in 1971.

Services
Most freight traffic on the line is magnetite from the Musan Mining Complex destined for the Kim Chaek Steel Complex, the Ch'ŏngjin Steel Works, the Sŏngjin Steel Complex and for Namyang Station for export to China.

Route 

A yellow background in the "Distance" box indicates that section of the line is not electrified.

References

Railway lines in North Korea
Standard gauge railways in North Korea